The 2018–19 Florida Panthers season was the 26th season for the National Hockey League franchise that was established on June 14, 1993. The Panthers were eliminated from playoff contention on March 26, 2019, after losing 6–1 to the Montreal Canadiens. This was also the final season for Roberto Luongo, who announced his retirement on June 26, 2019 after playing 19 seasons in the NHL.

Standings

Schedule and results

Preseason
The preseason schedule was published on June 14, 2018.

Regular season
The regular season schedule was released on June 21, 2018.

Player statistics
As of April 6, 2019

Skaters

Goaltenders

†Denotes player spent time with another team before joining the Panthers. Stats reflect time with the Panthers only.
‡Denotes player was traded mid-season. Stats reflect time with the Panthers only.Bold/italics denotes franchise record.

Transactions
The Panthers have been involved in the following transactions during the 2018–19 season.

Trades

Free agents

Waivers

Contract terminations

Retirement

Signings

Draft picks

Below are the Florida Panthers' selections at the 2018 NHL Entry Draft, which was held on June 22 and 23, 2018, at the American Airlines Center in Dallas, Texas.

Notes:
 The Arizona Coyotes' second-round pick went to the Florida Panthers as the result of a trade on August 25, 2016, that sent Dave Bolland and Lawson Crouse to Arizona in exchange for a third-round pick in 2017 and this pick (being conditional at the time of the trade).
 The Nashville Predators' third-round pick went to the Florida Panthers as the result of a trade on June 23, 2018, that sent a third-round pick in 2019 to Nashville in exchange for this pick.
 The San Jose Sharks' seventh-round pick went to the Florida Panthers as the result of a trade on June 19, 2018, that sent Vegas' fourth-round pick in 2018, a fifth-round pick in 2018 and a second-round pick in 2019 to San Jose in exchange for Mike Hoffman and this pick.

References

Florida Panthers seasons
Florida Panthers
Florida Panthers
Florida Panthers